Patty Jean Poole Judge (born November 2, 1943) is an American politician who served as the 45th lieutenant governor of Iowa from 2007 to 2011 and previously the 13th Secretary of Agriculture of Iowa from 1999 to 2007. She unsuccessfully ran for reelection as lieutenant governor in 2010 after being elected to the office in 2006 with Chet Culver as governor.

On March 4, 2016, she announced her candidacy for the Democratic nomination for the United States Senate and won the primary on June 7. She lost the general election to Republican incumbent Chuck Grassley.

Early life, education and career
Judge was born in Fort Madison, Iowa. She graduated from Albia High School. She received a Registered Nursing degree from Iowa Methodist School of Nursing which merged in the 1960s to be part of St. Luke's Regional Medical Center. She also attended the University of Iowa. As a registered nurse Judge has worked in public health. She developed the first in-service education program and first utilization review program for the Monroe County Hospital.

With her interest in economic development she was prompted to earn a real estate broker's license and set up a small business specializing in the selling and appraising of farms. During the farm crisis of the 1980s she was a mediator for the Iowa Farmer Creditor Mediation Service.

Judge is a lifelong resident of southern Iowa. She was raised in Albia, Iowa. She and her husband John have owned a cow-calf farm in Monroe County for thirty-five years. Her husband also served in the Iowa Senate. They have three sons and five grandchildren. She has been dedicated to community service, serving on the Albia Chamber of Commerce Board of Directors, as a 4-H leader, a member of PEO, an honorary FFA Chapter Farmer and a member of the Iowa State Fair Board.

In 2011 Judge's son Joe, a high school U.S. history & government teacher also in Albia, announced his intent to be the second generation of the family to serve in Iowa government by running for the Iowa House of Representatives in the 80th district in 2012. Joe was unsuccessful in this attempt and lost to Larry Sheets in the general election.

Political career

Iowa State Senate
Judge was elected to the Iowa State Senate from Iowa's 46th District in 1992 and then re-elected in 1996.  During her time in the Senate she served in the roles of assistant majority leader and assistant minority leader. She was the ranking member of the Agriculture Committee.  Other committees she served on were the Senate Natural Resources, Ways and Means, Appropriations, Small Business and Economic Development, and Human Services.

Iowa Secretary of Agriculture
Judge was first elected to the office of Iowa Secretary of Agriculture in 1998 and then re-elected in 2002.  She holds the honor of being the first woman to serve as Iowa Secretary of Agriculture.  Judge brought to the office a strong background in production agriculture, personnel management, finance, and the management of state government.

Iowa Lieutenant Governor

On February 15, 2006, Judge stepped down as a candidate for Governor of Iowa, announced her endorsement of Iowa Secretary of State Chet Culver for the office, and became his running mate as lieutenant governor. On November 7, 2006, she was elected Lieutenant Governor of Iowa.

Culver and Judge lost in their bid for re-election in 2010.

Judge announced on December 30, 2012, that she declined to run for lieutenant governor in 2014.

Co-chair of America's Renewable Future

In 2015, Judge was appointed the co-chair of a new bi-partisan PAC, whose sole purpose is to make candidates visiting Iowa aware of the need for the Renewable Fuel Standard. Judge has long been seen as a champion of agricultural issues and known for breaking barriers in being the first woman to serve as the Iowan Secretary of Agriculture. Judge has since met with many potential candidates to show them the importance of the RFS. Judge will continue to serve in this role throughout the 2016 Election Cycle.

2016 U.S. Senate election

On March 4, 2016, Judge announced her plan to run for the Senate Seat currently held by Senator Charles Grassley. The New York Times deemed her a "formidable challenger" to Grassley. Judge lost the election by a 24.4% margin.

See also
List of female lieutenant governors in the United States

References

External links
 Patty Judge for Senate campaign site 
 
 Campaign contributions for Gov/Lt. Gov. at the National Institute for Money in State Politics

|-

|-

|-

1943 births
American nurses
American women nurses
American women farmers
Farmers from Iowa
Democratic Party Iowa state senators
Lieutenant Governors of Iowa
Living people
People from Albia, Iowa
People from Fort Madison, Iowa
Secretaries of Agriculture of Iowa
Women state legislators in Iowa
21st-century American women politicians
Candidates in the 2016 United States Senate elections
21st-century American politicians